The Portugal national korfball team is managed by the Federaçao Portuguesa de Corfebol (FPC), representing Portugal in korfball international competitions.



Tournament history

Current squad

References

External links
 Federaçao Portuguesa de Corfebol

National korfball teams
Korfball
National team